Sri Ashtamsa Varadha Anjaneyar Temple is a Hindu temple dedicated to Hanuman located in Peelamedu, Coimbatore, Tamil Nadu, India. The idol of the deity is made of Salagrama stone. In the temple, Goddess Lakshmi graces the devotees from the right palm of Hanuman who tail faces North, direction of Kubera, God of wealth. The main deity faces west, is seen posing Abhaya Mudra with his right hand and holding a mace with the other hand. During the Tamil New Year, an offering of 10,008 fruits is made to the deity. Raja Maruthi Alankaram, Vennai Alankaram and Vadamalai offerings are the regular Sevas here on Saturdays. In the Tamil month of Purattasi, Vadai Malai, Swaya Roopam, Chenduram, Swarnamayam and Muthangi Sevai are offered to God on Saturdays.

Lord Hanuman, is decorated in different alankaram each day, which makes this temple very unusual. So don't be surprised to see Lord Hanuman gracing you in his various alankaram during your routine visit.

Best day to visit 

Since everyday Lord Hanuman graces devotees with different alankaram, one can visit the temple any day. Still there special days
 Every Saturday
 Tamil month of Purattasi, which starts from mid-September to mid-October of the Gregorian calendar
 Hanuman Jayanti

References

External links
 Ashtamsa Varadha Anjaneyar Temple - thedivineindia.com

Hindu temples in Coimbatore district
Tourist attractions in Coimbatore
Buildings and structures in Coimbatore